Aneflomorpha is a genus of beetles in the family Cerambycidae, containing the following species:

 Aneflomorpha aculeata (LeConte, 1873)
 Aneflomorpha arizonica Linsley, 1936
 Aneflomorpha australis Linsley, 1942
 Aneflomorpha brevipila Chemsak & Noguera, 2005
 Aneflomorpha cazieri Chemsak, 1962
 Aneflomorpha citrana Chemsak, 1960
 Aneflomorpha cribellata (Bates, 1892)
 Aneflomorpha crinita Chemsak & Linsley, 1975
 Aneflomorpha delongi (Champlain & Knull, 1922)
 Aneflomorpha exilis Chemsak & Noguera, 2005
 Aneflomorpha fisheri Linsley, 1936
 Aneflomorpha giesberti Chemsak & Linsley, 1975
 Aneflomorpha gilana Casey, 1924
 Aneflomorpha gracilis (Linsley, 1935)
 Aneflomorpha grandicolle (Linsley, 1942)
 Aneflomorpha hovorei Chemsak & Noguera, 2005
 Aneflomorpha lineare (LeConte, 1859)
 Aneflomorpha linsleyae Chemsak, 1962
 Aneflomorpha longispina Chemsak & Noguera, 2005
 Aneflomorpha longitudinis Chemsak & Noguera, 2005
 Aneflomorpha luteicornis Linsley, 1957
 Aneflomorpha martini Chemsak & Linsley, 1968
 Aneflomorpha mexicana (Linsley, 1935)
 Aneflomorpha minuta Chemsak, 1962
 Aneflomorpha modica Chemsak & Noguera, 2005
 Aneflomorpha opacicornis Linsley, 1957
 Aneflomorpha parkeri Knull, 1934
 Aneflomorpha parowana Casey, 1924
 Aneflomorpha parvipunctata Chemsak & Noguera, 2005
 Aneflomorpha preclara Chemsak & Linsley, 1975
 Aneflomorpha pueblae Chemsak & Noguera, 2005
 Aneflomorpha rectilinea Casey, 1924
 Aneflomorpha rosaliae Linsley, 1942
 Aneflomorpha ruficollis Chemsak & Linsley, 1975
 Aneflomorpha rufipes Chemsak & Linsley, 1968
 Aneflomorpha seminuda Casey, 1912
 Aneflomorpha semirufa Linsley, 1935
 Aneflomorpha subpubescens (LeConte, 1862)
 Aneflomorpha tenuis (LeConte, 1854)
 Aneflomorpha unispinosa Casey, 1912
 Aneflomorpha volitans (LeConte, 1873)
 Aneflomorpha wappesi Chemsak & Noguera, 2005
 Aneflomorpha werneri Chemsak, 1962

References

 
Elaphidiini